Mycobacterium indicus pranii (MIP), earlier known as Mw, is a non-pathogenic mycobacterial species, which, based on its growth characteristics and metabolic properties, is validly classified as a member of the Mycobacterium avium complex. The novelty of this bacterium is due to its translational application as an immunotherapeutic. The genome of the organism has now been completely sequenced.

The origin of the proposed name is a combination of the site of isolation of the bacterial species from India (indicus), discovery by Pran Talwar (pranii) and characterization at the National Institute of Immunology, India (pranii).

References

indicus pranii